Cryptocarya agathophylla (sometimes called clove nutmeg) is a member of the laurel family, Lauraceae, and originates in Madagascar. 

The former genus name Ravensara is a latinization of the Malagasy word .

Description
Cryptocarya agathophylla is a small to medium-sized tree, growing up to 15 meters high. The leaves and twigs of C. agathophylla have a mildly camphorous aroma similar to eucalyptus.

Range and habitat
Cryptocarya agathophylla is endemic to Madagascar. It grows in humid and subhumid lowland forests and lower montane forests and secondary vegetation between 10 and 1,300 meters elevation.

It is known from 11 locations in the central and eastern parts of Bongolava, Vatovavy Analanjirofo and Alaotra-Mangoro regions. Its estimated extent of occurrence (EOO) is 116,739 km2, the minimum area of occupancy (AOO) is 56 km2.

Conservation and threats
The species' population is decreasing, and its conservation status is Near Threatened. It is threatened by habitat loss, principally from shifting agriculture, and also from logging, mining, and grazing.

Essential oil 
The essential oil of C. agathophylla is used as a fragrance material in the perfumery industry, and as an antiseptic, anti-viral, antibacterial, expectorant, anti-infective in natural and folk medicine. Primary aromatic components are:

 limonene 19.38%
 sabinene 11.40%
 methyl chavicol 7.94%
 α-pinene 5.55%
 linalool 5.26%
 methyl eugenol 5.00%
 germacrene d 4.76%
 terpinen-4-ol 4.00%
 e-caryophyllene 3.54%
 δ-3-carene 3.52%
 myrcene 3.43%
 α-terpinene 2.98%
 β-pinene 2.91%
 γ-terpinene 2.15%
 α-phellandrene 1.99%
 camphene 1.33%
 (z)-β-ocimene 1.30%
 α-thujene 1.13%
 1,8-cineole 1.08%
 para-cymene 0.97%
 α-humulene 0.79%
 α-copaene 0.69%
 β-elemene 0.63%
 δ-cadinene 0.60%
 terpinolene 0.56%
 δ-elemene 0.55%
 α-cubebene 0.47%
 α-terpineol 0.38%
 α-guaiene 0.37%
 bornyl acetate 0.36%
 elemol 0.34%
 elemicin 0.23%
 γ-muurolene 0.22%
 borneol 0.21%
 bicyclogermacrene 0.20%
 γ-cadinene 0.19%
 (e)-β-ocimene 0.19%
 β-cubebene 0.16%
 eugenol 0.12%
 α-muurolene 0.11%
 δ-amorphene 0.10%
 α-eudesmol 0.10%
 cis-para-menth-2-en-1-ol 0.10%
 ortho-cymene 0.09%
 β-selinene 0.09%
 β-bourbonene 0.08%
 trans-cadina-1,4-diene 0.08%
 trans-para-menth-2-en-1-ol 0.08%
 cis-sabinene hydrate 0.08%
 trans-sabinene hydrate 0.08%
 caryophyllene oxide 0.07%
 β-copaene 0.07%
 germacrene b 0.07%
 cis-muurola-3,5-diene 0.07%
 trans-cadina-1(6),4-diene 0.06%
 γ-eudesmol 0.06%
 β-eudesmol 0.05%
 guaiol 0.05%

References

agathophylla
Endemic flora of Madagascar
Flora of the Madagascar lowland forests
Flora of the Madagascar subhumid forests